Llong railway station was a station in Llong, Flintshire, Wales. The station was opened on 14 August 1849 and closed on 30 April 1962. The station building is now a private residence.

In 1947 there were 8 trains a day each way.

References

Further reading

Disused railway stations in Flintshire
Railway stations in Great Britain opened in 1849
Railway stations in Great Britain closed in 1917
Railway stations in Great Britain opened in 1919
Railway stations in Great Britain closed in 1962
Former London and North Western Railway stations